Mycocepurus is a Neotropical genus of fungus-growing ants (tribe Attini) in the subfamily Myrmicinae. The genus is known from Mexico, south to Brazil and Argentina. Like other attines, they primarily grow fungi of the tribe Leucocoprini (family Agaricaceae). They use many different substrates for growing their fungi, from dry leaves and caterpillar dung to fruit matter. One of its species, Mycocepurus smithii, which lives in South America, reproduces by cloning – all ants in a colony are clones of the queen. M. castrator is a parasite of M. goeldii.

Species
 Mycocepurus castrator Rabeling & Bacci, 2010
 Mycocepurus curvispinosus MacKay 1998
 Mycocepurus goeldii (Forel, 1893)
 Mycocepurus obsoletus Emery, 1913
 Mycocepurus smithii (Forel, 1893)
 Mycocepurus tardus Weber, 1940

References

External links

Myrmicinae
Ant genera
Hymenoptera of South America
Hymenoptera of North America